Johnstone Glacier is a small glacier located  east of Zenith Glacier, draining from the southern extremity of the Lanterman Range in the Bowers Mountains of Victoria Land, Antarctica. The glacier was named by the New Zealand Geological Survey Antarctic Expedition to northern Victoria Land in 1967–68 for Ian Johnstone, chief scientific officer at Scott Base that season. The glacier is situated on the Pennell Coast, a portion of Antarctica lying between Cape William and Cape Adare.

References

Glaciers of Pennell Coast